Spindletop is a rural neighborhood north of Lexington, Kentucky, United States. Its boundaries are I-75 to the west and Berea Road to the south and east. It is located just south of the Kentucky Horse Park. It is named for Spindletop hall, a historic mansion once owned by Miles Franklin Yount, which is located within the neighborhood.

Neighborhood statistics
 Area: 
 Population: 126
 Population density: 393 people per square mile
 Median household income: $57,604

References

Neighborhoods in Lexington, Kentucky